Men's best and fairest: 
 1956-1960: Brady Award
 1961-1962: ALC Trophy
 1963–present: O C Isaachsen Trophy

 The Isaachsen Trophy is awarded to the best player in Australia competing in state domestic club competitions. The trophy was donated by Cedric Isaachsen to the Australian Lacrosse Council (ALC) in 1963. Isaachsen had a distinguished military career, rising to the rank of lieutenant colonel and earning the honour of Companion of the Distinguished Service Order (DSO), followed by a distinguished legal career. He was the president of ALC (1962-65), then vice-president for 14 years until 1979. He was elected as a fellow of the ALC in 1994. He lived in South Australia and died in 2009, aged 97 years.

Women's best and fairest (2012–present): Shelley Maher Trophy

 The trophy is named in honour of Shelley Maher and was instituted in 2012 by the ALA. As the last President of Women’s Lacrosse Australia (2001-2009) Shelley committed to excellence in all areas of administration. In her home state of Victoria Shelley was President of Women’s Lacrosse Victoria (1998-2001), and was elected a Life Member in 2001, and in 2009 of Women’s Lacrosse Australia. She was active as a player with Williamstown Women’s Lacrosse Club and represented Victoria in senior competition (2002, 2005). Shelley was an ALA Director (2007-2010) and now resides in the USA where she remains active in lacrosse as the Women’s Director on the Federation of International Lacrosse.

Votes are cast by referees in the highest-level competition in each State and are 'evened out' to allow for a different number of games played in various States.

* Players from the United States

See also

Lacrosse in Australia

References

External links
 ALA Honours and Awards

best and fairest
Australia